Wolvesbayne is a horror film, directed by Griff Furst and starring Jeremy London as a newly-mutated werewolf working with vampire hunters to stop a vampire cult with plans to resurrect Lilith, the mother of all vampires. It co-stars Yancy Butler, Christy Carlson Romano, and Marc Dacascos. Wolvesbayne premiered on Syfy's 31 Nights of Halloween in 2009.

Plot 
Following an attack, ruthless businessman Russell Bayne shapeshifts into a werewolf and seeks help from Alex Layton, an occult shop owner. Together, they learn that vampires under the leadership of Von Griem seek to resurrect their queen, Lilith, in order to unite the warring factions. Bayne allies with a vampire hunter, Jacob Van Helsing, and they battle Lilith and her vampire servants.

Cast 
 Jeremy London as Russell Bayne
 Christy Carlson Romano as Alex Layton
 Mark Dacascos as Von Griem
 Yancy Butler as Lilith
 Rhett Giles as Jacob Van Helsing
 Stephanie Honoré as Zafira
 Billy Slaughter as Felix

Production 
Ex-members of The Asylum produced the film under the banner of Bullet Films. It was announced and began production in 2008.

Release 
Wolvesbayne was first broadcast on Syfy on October 18, 2009, and it was released on video January 4, 2011.

Reception 
Scott Foy of Dread Central rated it 2.5/5 stars and wrote the film is "not half bad" but lacks focus on the promised werewolf action.

References

External links 
 

2009 television films
2009 horror films
American supernatural horror films
American vampire films
American werewolf films
Syfy original films
2009 films
Films directed by Griff Furst
American horror television films
2000s supernatural horror films
2000s American films